Dasht-e Sefa (also Romanized as Dasht-e Şefā) is a village in Berentin Rural District, Bikah District, Rudan County, Hormozgan Province, Iran. At the 2006 census, its population was 97, in 25 families.

References 

Populated places in Rudan County